Brooke Gladstone (born 1955) is an American journalist, author and media analyst. She is the host and managing editor of the WNYC radio program On the Media.

Career
Gladstone has covered media for much of her career. In the early 1980s, she covered public broadcasting for the industry newspaper  Current and reported for Cablevision and The Washington Weekly in Washington, D.C.

In 1987, Gladstone joined National Public Radio, first as editor of Weekend Edition with Scott Simon, and later became senior editor of All Things Considered. In 1991, she received a Knight Fellowship to study Russian language and history. A year later, she was reporting from Moscow for NPR, covering stories such as the bloody 1993 power struggle. In 1995, Gladstone returned to the United States and was hired as NPR's first "media reporter," based in New York City.

In October 2000, Gladstone joined WNYC—New York Public Radio—to help relaunch On the Media, a locally produced and nationally distributed radio show. By 2010, it had quadrupled its audience and earned several major journalism awards.

Gladstone wrote The Influencing Machine, a nonfiction graphic novel illustrated by Josh Neufeld and others in 2011. Gladstone describes the book as "a treatise on the relationship between us and the news media," further described by Leon Neyfakh as "a manifesto on the role of the press in American history as told through a cartoon version of herself." The influencing Machine was listed 7th among the 10 Masterpieces of Graphic Nonfiction by The Atlantic, and listed among the top books of 2011 by The New Yorker, Library Journal Kirkus Reviews and Publishers Weekly. Academic journals called her book, an illustration of the history of media's influence on culture.

In 2015 Gladstone was part of the cast of the historical documentary Best of Enemies, directed by Robert Gordon and Morgan Neville.

In 2017, Gladstone wrote The Trouble With Reality: A Rumination on Moral Panic in Our Time, a nonfiction book in which she talks about how people's filtered reality in a constantly changing media landscape threatens democracy, published by Workman Publishing Company.

In 2019, Gladstone joined NPR Detroit to host a one month long series on the house evictions crisis on Detroit today with Stephen Henderson. In 2022, she was a Critic in Residence at the American Academy in Rome.

Gladstone gives lectures as a guest lecturer at universities like Princeton and The University of Texas at Austin.

Personal life
Gladstone is married to Fred Kaplan, a journalist and author. Together they have twin daughters. Gladstone is Jewish and lives in Brooklyn, New York.

Honors and awards
 1991 John S. Knight Fellowships for Professional Journalists
 Overseas Press Club Award
 2003 Milwaukee Press Club Sacred Cat Award, 2003
 2004 Peabody award, 2004
 2012 Honorary Doctorate from The New School
 2020 Front Page Award for Radio In-Depth Reporting for the series "Busted: America's Poverty Myths"

Works

Notes

References

External links

 
 Brooke Gladstone biography at On the Media
 Gladstone speaking at Talks at Google (via YouTube)
 

1955 births
American radio journalists
Jewish American journalists
Living people
NPR personalities
Peabody Award winners
People from Long Island
Stanford University alumni
University of Vermont alumni
American women radio journalists
21st-century American Jews
21st-century American women